Merasheen is a community located on the southwestern tip of Merasheen Island in Placentia Bay in Newfoundland and Labrador, Canada. It was one of the largest and most prosperous communities in Placentia Bay to be resettled, with the provincial government paying residents to abandon the community and relocate to designated growth centres during the 1960s.

Reunions are common, and many former residents return to Merasheen in the summer months.

External links
Official site of the Merasheen Reunion and Garden Parties
Old Reunion site
Maritime History Archive

Ghost towns in Newfoundland and Labrador